Dion Omar Rudchell Malone (born 13 February 1989) is a Surinamese professional footballer who plays for Cypriot First Division club Karmiotissa. He also holds Dutch citizenship.

Club career
Born in Paramaribo, Suriname, Malone made his professional debut for Almere City (then called FC Omniworld) in the 2008–09 season.

On 24 June 2017, Malone signed a two-year contract with Azerbaijan Premier League side Gabala FK.

On 27 July 2018, it was announced Malone had returned to ADO Den Haag, having signed a two-year contract.

Malone joined Cypriot First Division club Karmiotissa on 19 July 2022, signing a one-year deal.

International career
He made his debut for Suriname national football team on 24 March 2021 in a World Cup qualifier against the Cayman Islands. On 25 June 2021, Malone was named to the Surinamese squad for the 2021 CONCACAF Gold Cup.

Career statistics

References

External links
 
 

1989 births
Living people
Sportspeople from Paramaribo
Association football fullbacks
Eredivisie players
Eerste Divisie players
Almere City FC players
ADO Den Haag players
NAC Breda players
Azerbaijan Premier League players
Gabala FC players
Karmiotissa FC players
Surinamese footballers
Suriname international footballers
Dutch footballers
Dutch sportspeople of Surinamese descent
Surinamese expatriate footballers
Expatriate footballers in the Netherlands
Surinamese expatriate sportspeople in the Netherlands
Expatriate footballers in Cyprus
Surinamese expatriate sportspeople in Cyprus
Expatriate footballers in Azerbaijan
People with acquired Dutch citizenship
2021 CONCACAF Gold Cup players